Helen Wardlaw (born 11 October 1982) is an English former cricketer who played for Yorkshire between 2000 and 2007.  A right-handed batter and right-arm off break bowler, she made her international debut for England in 2002, and played in three Test matches and seven One Day Internationals.

In March 2013, she relocated to Melbourne, Australia. She now lives in Bendigo, Victoria and umpires in the Bendigo District Cricket Association League.

References

External links
 

1982 births
Living people
England women Test cricketers
England women One Day International cricketers
Yorkshire women cricketers